Brian Alexander Robertson (born 12 September 1956) is a Scottish musician, composer and songwriter. He had a string of hits in the late 1970s and early 1980s characterised by catchy pop tunes and jaunty humorous lyrics, including "Knocked It Off", "To Be or Not to Be" and "Bang Bang", a tongue-in-cheek commentary on famous historical and fictional couples. He wrote with Mike Rutherford of Genesis the Grammy-nominated and Ivor Novello Award-winning "The Living Years". It was a number one hit in the US, Canada, Australia and Ireland and reached number 2 in his native UK. He has also written music for films and been a television presenter.

Early life
Born in Glasgow, Robertson was educated at the former Allan Glen's School, Glasgow, and the Royal Scottish Academy of Music & Drama.

Career
He released his debut album Wringing Applause, recorded with Terry Manning, on the Ardent Records label (also home of Big Star) in 1973, but it was to be a further six years until he found success in the United Kingdom chart.

Robertson had hits between 1979 and 1981 in the UK Singles Chart, the first of which – "Bang Bang" – reached number 2 in August 1979. Follow-up singles "Knocked It Off", "Kool in the Kaftan" and "To Be or Not to Be" reached chart positions 8, 17 and 9 respectively. All the singles came from his third album Initial Success, which reached number 32 in the UK Albums Chart. In 1981 he had his last top 40 hit under his own name (to date) performing a duet with Maggie Bell, of a cover version of "Hold Me" which reached number 11.

He co-wrote the hit songs "Carrie" and "Wired for Sound" for Cliff Richard and seven of the 12 songs on Richard's Rock 'n' Roll Juvenile (1979) album. Robertson wrote and sang the theme music to the television series Maggie and Multi-Coloured Swap Shop ("Hello, Hello"), and wrote and sang backing vocals for the Swap Shop spin-off group Brown Sauce's UK top 20 hit, "I Wanna Be a Winner". In 1982, Robertson composed "Down at the Superstore", the theme to the BBC1 children's television series Saturday Superstore. It was released as a single by The Assistants, a supergroup featuring Robertson, Dave Edmunds, Cheryl Baker, Junior and Suzi Quatro.

Robertson was a guest presenter on Top of the Pops on 28 August 1980, alongside then-BBC Radio 1 DJ Peter Powell. In October 1980, Robertson appeared as a guest on the BBC Television chat show Friday Night, Saturday Morning. In the sixth and final series of the same show, Robertson appeared on one programme (January 1982) as the show's host. In February 1981 Robertson appeared playing live in concert on the BBC joint television and radio programme Rock Goes to College. He appeared at the then Preston Polytechnic, Lancashire. He also appeared as one of the Entertainers in the movie The Monster Club starring Vincent Price, John Carradine, and Donald Pleasence.

Robertson presented a two-part documentary, Jock 'n' Roll Parts I & II charting the history of pop music in Scotland and also presented a short-lived television programme, B. A. in Music, which featured contributions from musician guests. The show made Channel 4's 2000 list 100 Greatest TV Moments from Hell after Robertson's guest Bow Wow Wow singer Annabella Lwin took exception to his comments about her, calling Robertson an 'old hippie' and the programme a 'pretty shit show' before walking out in disgust.

Robertson wrote "We Have a Dream" for the 1982 World Cup Scotland squad, and played the lead in the film Living Apart Together, directed by Charlie Gormley. In 1983 Robertson, along with co-songwriters Terry Britten and Sue Shifrin, won a Razzie Award for the Worst 'Original' Song for "Pumpin' and Blowin'" as featured in the 1982 film The Pirate Movie.

Beginning in 1985, Robertson regularly wrote songs with Mike Rutherford for Rutherford's band Mike + The Mechanics. He contributed to all the albums released by the original configuration of the band, from Mike + The Mechanics to Rewired. Among the songs Robertson and Rutherford wrote together are the hits "Silent Running" and "The Living Years". The latter was written after Robertson's father died twelve weeks before the birth of his own son, and was nominated for a Grammy Award for Song of the Year in 1990.

In 1987, Robertson co-wrote several and produced two tracks on the Eddie and the Tide album Looking for Adventure. In 1991, Robertson was billed as the co-producer and executive musical producer for Simply Mad About the Mouse: A Musical Celebration of Imagination, a 1991 direct-to-video release featuring top contemporary singers performing "classic Disney songs".

Robertson's stage name was often mentioned in the BBC Two satirical sketch comedy programme The Fast Show, during the recurring sketch "Chanel 9", a parody of Mediterranean TV channels. The joke was based on occasionally intelligible (to English speaking audiences) names appearing in foreign broadcast speech.

Robertson appeared on the Scottish segment of BBC's Children in Need telethon on 14 November 2008, performing a re-worked version of "We Have a Dream" alongside Edwyn Collins, The Gospel Truth Choir, the Tartan Army, and a host of Scottish celebrities. On 16 January 2010, he performed with a live band in Glasgow for the first time since 1981 as part of the Celtic Connections Festival. "A Scottish Songbook" featured a number of diverse artists performing songs written by Scots, and Robertson performed "Twisted" (written by Annie Ross and Wardell Gray) and his own "The Living Years" – backed by house band Session A9 and The Gospel Truth Choir. The event was filmed for subsequent broadcast by BBC Scotland.

A new version of "The Living Years" was released as a single in July 2020, under his own name. A newly released version of "Silent Running" by BA Robertson will be available from July 22, 2022. All proceeds from this recording will be for the Mail Force-Ukraine Appeal.

Discography

Albums

Singles

Songs written for others
Excludes covers of songs originally sung by Robertson

Filmography

Film

Television

See also
List of songs that retell a work of literature
List of performers on Top of the Pops
List of performances on Top of the Pops

References

External links

Living people
Musicians from Glasgow
Scottish songwriters
20th-century Scottish male singers
Scottish pop singers
Scottish keyboardists
People educated at Allan Glen's School
Asylum Records artists
1950s births
British male songwriters